Gurvansaikhan (Three beauty) is a sum (district) of Dundgovi Province in central Mongolia. In 2007, its population was 2,578.

References 

Districts of Dundgovi Province